Theunissen is a Dutch patronymic surname meaning "son of Theunis", a nickname for Anthonius. People with this surname include:

 (1863–1918), French sculptor
Elriesa Theunissen (born 1993), South African cricketer
Gerald Theunissen (born 1933), American (Louisiana) politician and businessman
James Theunissen (born 1981), English cricketer
 (1905–1979), Dutch archbishop of Malawi
Marthinus Theunissen (1911-1983),  South African sprinter 
 (born 1932), German philosopher
Nicolaas Theunissen (1867–1929), South African cricketer
Werner Theunissen (1942-2010), Dutch composer and musician

Theunisse
Gert-Jan Theunisse (born 1963), Dutch road racing cyclist

See also
Teunissen
Theunissen, a small town in South Africa
Bill Theunissen Stadium

Dutch-language surnames
Afrikaans-language surnames
Patronymic surnames
Surnames from given names